Mount Zion College of Engineering (MZC) was established in 2001 at Kadammanitta, Pathanamthitta District, Kerala, India. Affiliated to APJ Abdul Kalam Technological University in Thiruvananthapuram and Mahatma Gandhi University in Kottayam, it is managed by the charitable Educational and Welfare Society.

See also
 List of Engineering Colleges in Kerala

References

Engineering colleges in Kerala
Universities and colleges in Pathanamthitta district
Colleges affiliated to Mahatma Gandhi University, Kerala
Educational institutions established in 2001
2001 establishments in Kerala
APJ Abdul Kalam Technological University